Coleophora kalidii is a moth of the family Coleophoridae.

The larvae feed on Kalidium foliatum. They feed on the generative organs of their host plant.

References

kalidii
Moths described in 1989